Sand is the administrative centre of the municipality of Suldal in Rogaland county, Norway. The village lies on the shore of the Sandsfjorden at the mouth of the river Suldalslågen, just south of the mouth of the Hylsfjorden.

The newspaper Suldalsposten is published in Sand.

Norwegian National Road 13 runs through the eastern part of the village. Sand Church is also located in the village.

References

Villages in Rogaland
Suldal